Eli Barkai is a professor of physics at Bar-Ilan University, located in Ramat-Gan, Israel.

Education
Barkai studied physics in Tel Aviv University, completing his Ph.D. in 1998. He then joined Bob Silbey at MIT for his post-doctoral studies. In 2002 he joined the faculty of Notre Dame University and in 2004 returned to Israel to Bar Ilan University where he became a full professor in 2010.

Research
His main research is in the field of non-equilibrium statistical mechanics. In particular he helped develop the theory of
fractional kinetic equations for anomalous diffusion and relaxation, theory of single molecule spectroscopy, and weak ergodicity breaking.
Among the physical systems he studied are  blinking of quantum dots, the diffusion of cold atoms in atomic traps and the diffusion of single molecules within a live cell.

Honors and awards
Barkai has received several prizes: the Krill prize (2006, selected by the Wolf foundation), the Michael Bruno Memorial award (2009, selected by Yad Hanadiv) and the Friedrich Wilhelm Bessel Research award (2011, selected by the Alexander von Humboldt foundation).

Family
Married to Adina Alster, daughter of Jonas Alster. Barkai has three children

References

External links
 Eli Barkai in Bar Ilan University's website
 Eli Barkai's Page
 

Israeli physicists
Israeli Jews
Tel Aviv University alumni
1964 births
Living people
Jewish physicists